The writing systems of the Formosan languages are Latin-based alphabets. Currently, 16 languages (45 dialects) have been regulated. The alphabet was made official in 2005.

History
The Sinckan Manuscripts are one of the earliest written materials of several Formosan languages, including Siraya. This writing system was developed by Dutch missionaries in the period of Dutch ruling (1624–1662).

After 1947, with the need for translation of Bible, Latin scripts for Bunun, Paiwan, Taroko, Atayal, and Amis were created. Currently, all 16 Formosan languages are written with similar systems. The Pe̍h-ōe-jī of Taiwanese Hokkien and Pha̍k-fa-sṳ of Taiwanese Hakka were also created with by the western missionaries.

In 2005, standardized writing systems for the languages of Taiwan's 16 recognized indigenous peoples were established by the government.

Alphabets
The table shows how the letters and symbols are used to denote sounds in the 16 officially recognized Formosan languages.

Spelling rules

Revision
Revision of the alphabets is under discussion. The table below is a summary of the proposals and decisions (made by the indigenous peoples and linguists). Symbols enclosed with angle brackets ‹› are letters, while those enclosed with square brackets [] are from the International Phonetic Alphabet. The names of dialects are written in Chinese.

See also 
 Formosan languages
 Taiwanese indigenous peoples
 Languages of Taiwan

References

Further reading

External links
 Taiwanese Indigenous Ebooks: This site provides open access ebooks for the indigenous languages.

Taiwanese indigenous peoples
Austronesian languages
 
Languages of Taiwan
Endangered Austronesian languages
Latin alphabets
Multilingual orthographies